Asaccus elisae, also known as Elisa's leaf-toed gecko or Werner's leaf-toed gecko, is a species of gecko, a lizard in the family Phyllodactylidae. The species is native to the Middle East.

Etymology
The specific name, elisae (feminine, genitive singular), is in honor of a woman or girl named Elisa, perhaps Franz Werner's wife or daughter; unfortunately, in the original description, he did not specify.

Geographic range
A. elisae is found in southern Turkey (southeastern Anatolia; in only a few areas on the Euphrates River valley) and southeastward to the eastern part of Syria (known only from Abu Kamal and Al Salhyeh) to eastern and northern parts of Iraq and to western Iran.

Habitat
It prefers rocky habitats having little vegetation. It has also been recorded in caves, and also in ruins in Iran such as old buildings and houses.

Description
It has strongly keeled dorsal tubercles. The tail, which is thin, is longer than SVL.

Reproduction
A. elisae is oviparous. Each adult female lays at least two clutches per year.  Each clutch contains one or two eggs.

References

Further reading
Schmidt KP (1939). "Reptiles and Amphibians from Southwestern Asia". Zoological Series of Field Museum of Natural History 24: 49–92. (Phyllodactylus elisae, p. 56).
Sindaco R, Jeremčenko VK (2008). The Reptiles of the Western Palearctic. 1. Annotated Checklist and Distributional Atlas of the Turtles, Crocodiles, Amphisbaenians and Lizards of Europe, North Africa, Middle East and Central Asia. (Monographs of the Societas Herpetologica Italica). Latina, Italy: Edizioni Belvedere. 580 pp. .
Werner F (1895). "Ueber eine Sammlung von Reptilien aus Persien, Mesopotamien und Arabien ". Verhandlungen der kaiserlich-königlichen zoologisch-botanischen Gesellschaft in Wien 45: 13–20. (Phyllodactylus elisae, new species, p. 14 + Plate III, figures 1, 1a–1d). (in German).

Asaccus
Reptiles of Iran
Reptiles of Iraq
Reptiles of Syria
Reptiles of Turkey
Reptiles described in 1895
Taxa named by Franz Werner